The Highland Locomotive Company is a subsidiary of the Strathspey Railway Company.  The Strathspey Railway Company operate and own most of the Strathspey Railway, a heritage railway based in the Central Scottish Highlands.

The Highland Locomotive Company own two steam locomotives based on the Strathspey Railway.  They are:
Former British Railways Locomotive Number 46512, a 2-6-0 tender engine with a simple 2 cylinder locomotive. It was designed for the London Midland and Scottish Railway (LMS) and built by British Railways at Swindon Works in 1952.  The locomotive was designed by George Ivatt to replace many of the ageing 0-6-0 engines that the LMS used to work on secondary duties and rural branches. Now named "E.V. Cooper Engineer", after the engineer who led the restoration.
Former Wemyss Private Railway Number 17, an 0-6-0 tank engine built by Andrew Barclay Sons & Co. at Kilmarnock in 1935(works number 2017) for hauling coal trains in Fife. At Aviemore awaiting overhaul. Named "Braeriach" after a local mountain.

Heritage railways in Scotland
Tourist attractions in Highland (council area)
Companies based in Highland (council area)